I Witness is a 2003 American action thriller film directed by Rowdy Herrington, starring Jeff Daniels, James Spader, Portia de Rossi, Clifton Collins Jr. and Wade Williams. Released in the United States on February 1, 2003, and re-released by Universal in 2007.

Plot

On his last assignment prior to resigning, burned out human rights activist James Rhodes arrives in Tijuana to help oversee local union elections, which are occurring in a chemical factory built by a US corporation, an election tainted with violence.

While there, he becomes embroiled in the investigation of a mass murder in what appears to be a drug runners' tunnel on the Tijuana/San Diego border, which was casually discovered. He teams up with a local honest street cop and a US official all under the watchful eye of State Department attache, eager to pin the killings on a drug cartel. But when Rhodes links the human rights atrocity to the murder of two American teenage dirt bikers and discovers they all have been poisoned with chemicals, he uncovers a web of corruption between the US corporation, who owns the factory, and the local police, only to realize that he himself has become a dangerous liability to those who pull the puppet strings on one of the world's most dangerous borders.

Now he has to solve the murders before becoming the next victim.

Cast 

 Jeff Daniels as James Rhodes
 James Spader as Douglas Draper 
 Portia de Rossi as Emily Thompson
 Clifton Collins, Jr. as Claudio Castillo
 Wade Williams as Roy Logan
 Jordi Caballero as Captain Madrid
 Pablo Cunqueiro as Father Perez

History

Originally entitled "God's Witness," the script by Colin Greene and rock star Robert Ozn found its way on to many Hollywood executives' "best un-produced screenplays" lists.  While it was set up multiple times with a variety of film stars, directors and producers, the film fell apart repeatedly over a period of eight years.  Finally, executive producer Paul de Souza was able to get the screenplay in front of David Bixler, then Senior VP of Promark Films.  Bixler and Promark's founder, Jonathan Kramer, procured tax credit financing in Puerto Rico and brought producer/casting director Julia Verdin on board along with director Rowdy Herrington.   The project got its green light when both Jeff Daniels and James Spader read the material and signed on.

Greene and Ozn won the 2003 Method Fest Best Screenplay Award.

References

External links
 

2003 films
2003 action thriller films
2000s English-language films
American action thriller films
Films about Mexican drug cartels
Films directed by Rowdy Herrington
Films scored by David Kitay
Films set in Tijuana
Films shot in Mexico
Films shot in Puerto Rico
2000s American films
2000s Mexican films